Simon Kistemaker may refer to

 Simon Kistemaker (football manager) (1941–2021), Dutch football manager
 Simon J. Kistemaker (1930–2017), American New Testament scholar